Dagai is a village and town in Buner District of Khyber Pakhtunkhwa.

References

Populated places in Buner District
Buner District